Acontias percivali, also known commonly as Percival's lance skink, Percival's legless lizard, and the Tanzanian legless lizard, is a species of small, legless (snake-like) lizard in the family Scincidae. The species is endemic to Africa.

Etymology
The specific name, percivali, is in honor of British naturalist Arthur Blayney Percival (1874–1940), who was a game warden in East Africa.

Geographic range
The geographic range of A. percivali is limited to continental Africa and includes regions of Angola, Botswana, Kenya, Namibia, South Africa, Tanzania, and Zimbabwe.

Habitat
Percival's lance skink inhabits savannas by burrowing just below the surface of the soil.

Subspecies
The two subspecies of A. percivali are:  
A. p. percivali 
A. p. tasmani 

A. p. tasmani may be a subspecies of Acontias meleagris as seen after DNA sequencing tests.

Description
Percival's lance skink can be identified by its copper-brown back and gold underside. It is an insectivores that specializes in feeding on beetle larvae, earthworms, and other slow-moving invertebrates.

Reproduction
A. percivali is ovoviviparous and has one to five young at a time.

As pets
Although this A. percivali is poorly understood, it is occasionally seen in pet shops.  Most Acontias specimens in the pet trade are wild-collected.  In captivity, they require a deep layer of sandy substrate and hollow hiding places on the surface.  Captive breeding may be possible, but currently has not been accomplished commercially.

References

Further reading
Branch WR (1991). "Life History Note: Acontias percivali tasmani: Size and Predation". J. Herp. Assoc. Africa (39): 23-23.
Branch, Bill (2004). Field Guide to Snakes and other Reptiles of Southern Africa. Third Revised Edition, Second impression. Sanibel Island, Florida: Ralph Curtis Books. 399 pp. . (Acontias percivali, pp. 134–135 + Plate 44).
Loveridge A (1935). "Scientific Results of an Expedition to Rain Forest Regions in Eastern Africa. I. New Reptiles and Amphibians from East Africa". Bull. Mus. Comp. Zool. Harvard 79 (1): 1-19. (Acontias percivali, new species, pp. 13–15).

External links
Daniels SR, Heideman NJ, Hendricks MGJ, Crandall KA (2005). "Unraveling evolutionary lineages in the limbless fossorial skink genus Acontias ". Molecular Phylogenetics and Evolution 34 (3): 645–654.

Acontias
Reptiles described in 1935